Leigh Lynch was an American racecar driver, who was active in the years 1906-1910.

Racing career
Lynch won the 1909 Wheeler-Schebler Trophy Race at the Indianapolis Motor Speedway (IMS). This was the final race of the track's first weekend of automobile races, and was also the last race held before the track's surface of crushed stone was replaced with brick. Lynch also started nine other races at IMS during 1909 and 1910, including a second-place finish in the 1910 Wheeler-Schebler Race. Little is known of Lynch's career outside of his appearances at IMS. He is known to have earned victories in two hill climb races at Box Springs Canyon in Riverside, California, and in a  race at the Mardi Gras Track in New Orleans, Louisiana.

Sources

 Scott, D. Bruce; INDY: Racing Before the 500; Indiana Reflections; 2005; .
Galpin, Darren;  A Record of Motorsport Racing Before World War I.
http://www.motorsport.com/stats
http://www.champcarstats.com

American racing drivers
Sports in Riverside, California